Fehlfarben is a Neue Deutsche Welle music band from Düsseldorf, Germany, that was formed in 1979. Its founding members were Peter Hein (vocals), former member of the Band Mittagspause ("lunch break"), Thomas Schwebel (guitar, former Mittagspause, S.Y.P.H.), Michael Kemner (bass, former member of 20 Colors, Mau Mau, DAF, YOU), Frank Fenstermacher (saxophone, later Der Plan), Markus Oehlen and Uwe Bauer (drums, former Mittagspause, Materialschlacht).

Band name
The band name is derived from a German term referring to cigars with a discoloured wrapper leaf and sold cheaply; singer Peter Hein was in this line of work at Xerox while in the band.

Band history
Fehlfarben was formed in 1979 out of members of Mittagspause and other musicians from the Düsseldorf punk scene. Initially moving away from the Clash and Wire influenced punk of Mittagspause to experiment with ska, Fehlfarben settled into a sound perhaps most comparable to their English contemporaries Gang of Four. Signing a contract with the German subsidiary of EMI lost them their status as an underground band, but in 1980 they released their debut, Monarchie und Alltag (Monarchy and everyday life), an album recognized then and now as one of the most important German-language rock records. Despite its cultural impact, Monarchie und Alltag did not reach gold status in Germany until 2000.

The single "Ein Jahr (Es geht voran)" ("One Year (It's moving onward)") from Monarchie und Alltag, which would be their only hit single, was in fact disliked by the band members themselves, who had initially produced its slick disco groove more in jest than seriousness.

Shortly after having released their debut album, Fehlfarben suffered the departure of lead singer Peter Hein owing to his frustration at the follow-up tour's being lengthened from three to six weeks on short notice. He went back to his day job at Xerox, where he worked until 2003. The band released two more albums without Hein during the 1980s, 33 Tage in Ketten (33 days in chains) and Glut und Asche (Blaze and ashes), with only the latter making it onto the German charts. After struggles with their label, they disbanded at the end of 1984.

The first comeback with all the original members took place in 1990s; it saw (to mixed reviews) the release of two LPs: Die Platte des himmlischen Friedens (The record of heavenly peace) and Popmusik und Hundezucht (Pop music and dog breeding).

In 2002, the band launched another comeback behind the album Knietief im Dispo (Knee deep in the overdraft loan). The album coincided with a general revival of interest in the early days of German punk and new wave.

Discography

Studio albums
 Monarchie und Alltag (Welt-Rekord, EMI Electrola 1980)
 33 Tage in Ketten (Welt-Rekord, EMI Electrola 1981)
 Glut und Asche (Welt-Rekord, EMI Electrola 1983)
 Die Platte des Himmlischen Friedens (Königshaus, 1991)
 Live (Ata Tak, 1993)
 Popmusik und Hundezucht (Plattenmeister, D.D.R. 1995, recorded 1984)
 Knietief im Dispo (!K7 Records, Wonder, 2002)
 26½ (V2, 2006)
 Handbuch für die Welt (V2, 2007)
 Live hier und jetzt (Ata Tak, 2009)
 Glücksmaschinen (Tapete, 2010)
 Xenophonie (Tapete, 2012)
 Über … Menschen (Tapete, 2015)
 ?0?? (Tapete, 2022)

Singles
 Große Liebe - Maxi/Abenteuer & Freiheit (1980)
 Das Wort ist draußen/Wie bitte was?! (1981)
 Ein Jahr (Es geht voran) (1982)
 14 Tage (1982)
 Untitled (1982)
 Agenten in Raucherkinos (1983)
 Tag und Nacht (1983)
 'Magnificent Obsession (1983)
 Keine ruhige Minute/Der Himmel weint (1985)
 Ein Jahr (Es geht voran) (Remix) (1990)
 In Zeiten wie diesen (1991)
 Es war vor Jahren/Das sind die Leute (1991)
 In Zeiten wie diesen (1991)
 Club der schönen Mütter (2002)
 Alkoholen (2003)
 Der Chef/Das war vor Jahren (Live) (2003) - with Rockformation Diskokugel
 Wir warten (2010)
 Wir warten (Ihr habt die Uhr, wir die Zeit) (2010)
 Platz da!! (2012)

Compilations
 2006 - Silver Monk Time - A Tribute to The Monks (29 bands cover The Monks) play loud! productions

References

External links

 http://www.fehlfarben.com
 http://gesellschaftsinseln.de
 

Musical groups established in 1979
Musical groups from Düsseldorf
Neue Deutsche Welle groups
1979 establishments in West Germany
German new wave musical groups
Tapete Records artists
V2 Records artists
EMI Group artists